Dyspessa argaeensis is a species of moth of the family Cossidae. It is found in Turkey.

References

Moths described in 1905
Dyspessa
Moths of Asia